Karen Gaddis is an American politician who served as a member of the Oklahoma House of Representatives for the 75th district from 2017 to 2018.

A retired teacher, Gaddis was elected to her seat in a special election in 2017; she replaced Dan Kirby, who resigned earlier in the year following a sexual harassment scandal. Gaddis had previously lost to Kirby in the 2016 election.

References

External links
Campaign website

Living people
21st-century American politicians
Democratic Party members of the Oklahoma House of Representatives
Politicians from Tulsa, Oklahoma
Women state legislators in Oklahoma
Year of birth missing (living people)
21st-century American women politicians